Meena is a tribe mainly found in Rajasthan, India.

Meena may also refer to:

People

As a given name
 Meena (actress), South Indian actress known as Meena Durairaj
 Meena (Malayalam actress) (1941–1997), Indian actress in Malayalam movies
 Meena Harris (born 1984), American lawyer and children's book author, niece of U.S. Vice President Kamala Harris
 Meena Kandasamy (born 1984), emerging poet, fiction writer, and translator and activist with the Dalit Panthers of India
 Meena Kapoor (1930–2017), Indian singer of the 1940s
 Meena Keshwar Kamal (1956–1987), Afghan feminist
 Meena Khadikar, Indian composer and daughter of Deenanath Mangeshkar
 Meena Kumari (1933–1972), Indian-Hindi film actress
 Meena Kumari (sport shooter) (born 1983), Indian sport shooter
 Meena Kumari (weightlifter) (born 1994), Indian weightlifter
 Meena Lee (born 1981), South Korean professional golfer
 Meena Rana, Indian singer
 Meena Shah (badminton) (1937–2015), Indian badminton player

As a surname
 Arjun Lal Meena, Indian politician
 C. K. Meena, Indian journalist and novelist
 Chhuttan Lal Meena, Indian Politician
 Golma Devi Meena, Indian politician
 Gopal Meena, Indian politician
 Gopi Chand Meena, Indian politician
 Harish Meena, Indian politician
 James Meena (born 1951), American conductor and opera administrator
 Jaskaur Meena (born 1947), Indian politician
 Kanwar Lal Meena, Indian politician
 Kirodi Lal Meena, Indian politician
 Mamta Meena, Indian politician
 Mool Chand Meena, Indian politician
 Murari Lal Meena, Indian politician
 Namo Narain Meena (born 1943), Indian politician
 Nand Lal Meena (born 1936), Indian politician from Baran district, Rajasthan
 Nand Lal Meena (born 1946), Indian politician, former cabinet minister in the Government of Rajashtan
 Phool Singh Meena, Indian politician
 Raghuveer Meena (born 1959), Indian politician
 Ramesh Chand Meena (born 1963), Indian politician
 Samrath Lal Meena, Indian politician
 Santosh Meena, Indian politician
 Shyam Lal Meena (born 1965), Indian archer
 Ramkesh Meena, Indian politician

Fictional characters
 Meena (character), from the South Asian television series Meena
 Meena, from the British web series Corner Shop Show
 Meena, one of the main characters from the film Sing
 Meena Jutla, from the British soap opera Emmerdale

Other
 Meena (film), a 2014 American documentary film
 "Meena" (song), a 2014 single by Saif Samejo
 Meena (TV series), a South Asian children's animated television series
 Meena Bazaar

See also
 Mena (disambiguation)
 Mina (disambiguation)
 Myna, bird